The fixture between Djurgårdens IF and Hammarby IF is a local derby in Stockholm, Sweden. This important football rivalry traces its origin back to a tug-of-war tournament in 1894.

There is a certain social aspect in the Hammarby - Djurgården rivalry. Hammarby consider the formerly working class neighbourhood of Södermalm, where their former home ground Söderstadion is situated, their stronghold. Djurgården count Östermalm, an affluent neighbourhood that forms the eastern part of the city centre, and where their former home ground Stadion is situated, as their stronghold. (Both clubs also maintain a cross-town rivalry with AIK, whose stronghold is the northwestern Stockholm urban area, where their home ground is situated.)

The two teams did not meet for five years (2010-2014) when Hammarby played in the second tier Superettan with Djurgården remaining in Allsvenskan. In 2013, both Djurgården and Hammarby moved into the newly built Tele2 Arena located in Johanneshov, just south of the city centre. This increased tensions significantly between the two sets of fans.

Matches

Djurgårdens IF in the league at home

Hammarby IF in the league at home

Cup

Records

Biggest wins (5+ goals)

Longest runs

Most consecutive wins

Most appearances

Goalscorers

Top scorers

Consecutive goalscoring

Shared player history

Transfers

 Oscar Gustafsson (Djurgården to Hammarby) (1916)
 Bertil Andersson (Djurgården to Hammarby) (1933)
 Axel Sidén (Djurgården to Hammarby) (1935)
 Arvid Schough (Djurgården to Hammarby) (1939)
 Ingmar Holm (Djurgården to Hammarby) (1940)
 Gösta Lantz (Djurgården to Hammarby) (1941)
 Bertil Jansson (Djurgården to Hammarby) (1948)
 Erik Ernström (Djurgården to Hammarby) (1950)
 Axel Eriksson (Djurgården to Hammarby) (1951)
 Aldor Eriksson (Djurgården to Hammarby) (1951)
 Folke Holmberg (Hammarby to Djurgården) (1951)
 Folke Holmberg (Djurgården to Hammarby) (1953)
 Hans Holmqvist (Djurgården to Hammarby) (1984)
 Kjell Granqvist (Hammarby to Djurgården) (1986)
 Leif Strandh (Hammarby to Djurgården) (1991)
 Leif Strandh (Djurgården to Hammarby) (1992)
 Kaj Eskelinen (Djurgården to Hammarby) (1998)
 Johan Andersson (Djurgården to Hammarby) (1998)
 Hjalmar Ekdal (Hammarby to Djurgården) (2021)

Played for both clubs

 Paul Lundberg (Djurgården to Åtvidaberg to Hammarby) (1936)
 Jan Svensson (Djurgården to IS Halmia Hammarby) (1974)
 Dan Brzokoupil (Djurgården to Landskrona to Hammarby) (1975)
 Lars Stenbäck (Djurgården to IFK Västerås to Hammarby) (1976)
 Thomas Sunesson (Djurgården to Brommapojkarna to Hammarby) (1989)
 Klebér Saarenpää (Djurgården to IFK Norrköping to AaB to Sirius to Hammarby) (2005)
 Rami Shaaban (Djurgården to Arsenal to Brighton & Hove Albion to Fredrikstad to Hammarby) (2008)
 Louay Chanko (Djurgården to Malmö FF to AEK Athens to Hammarby) (2009)
 Jesper Blomqvist (Djurgården to Enköping to Hammarby) (2010)
 Luis Antonio Rodríguez (Djurgården to AaB to Sunkar to Hammarby) (2012)
 Stefan Batan (Djurgården to Assyriska to Hammarby) (2014)

Played for one club, managed the other
 Sören Åkeby (played for Hammarby, managed Djurgården)
 Michael Andersson (played for Hammarby, managed Djurgården)
 Michael Borgqvist (played for Djurgården, managed Hammarby)
 Tommy Davidsson (played for Djurgården, managed Hammarby)
 Kim Bergstrand (played for Hammarby, managed Djurgården)

Managed both clubs

1 Only competitive matches are counted.

See also
AIK Fotboll–Hammarby Fotboll rivalry
Tvillingderbyt

References

Djurgårdens IF Fotboll
Hammarby Fotboll
Football derbies in Sweden
Football in Stockholm